Elizabeth Burgin (before 1760 – after 1790) was an American patriot during the American Revolutionary War who helped over 200 prisoners of war escape British prison ships.

Life 
Not much is known of Elizabeth Burgin's early life. She was a mother of three and probably a war widow. Burgin brought food for prisoners of war housed on British prison ships in New York. In 1779, she was approached by George Washington, a member of the Culper Spy Ring, to help prisoners of war escape the prison ships.

Some time later, the British intercepted a letter sent from George Washington to Benjamin Tallmadge, which talked about Higday's espionage. On July 13, 1779, Higday's home was raided by the British and arrested him. Higday's wife, in order to help her husband, told the British about Burgin's help. As a result, British authorities attempted to locate her and placed a bounty of £200 (£ or $ in 2016). Burgin hid for two weeks before moving to Long Island. After hiding for another five weeks, she moved to Connecticut and finally Philadelphia.

In October 1779, Burgin received a flag of truce from the Board of War in order for her to get her children from New York back to Philadelphia. However she was not allowed to take her clothes or furniture.  Since she was left with essentially nothing, Burgin petitioned to Washington in November 1779 for assistance. On December 25, 1779 George Washington allowed her to receive rations. Burgin received an annuity starting from 1781 and claimed the funds at least through 1787.

Notes

References 
 
 

People of New York (state) in the American Revolution
Women in the American Revolution
Year of death missing
Place of birth missing
Year of birth uncertain